Amar Singh, was the military general for Raja Upananda of Brahmachal, and later its king.

Biography
Amar Singh started out as a normal military officer for Brahmachal (Southern Sylhet) ruled by Raja Jayananda. Jayananda had two sons, Srinanda the elder and Upananda the younger. Singh conspired against the elder brother from taking the throne by taking advantage of Srinanda's chronic rheumatism. He was able to get Upananda to join his side. Srinanda protested against this proposal but was unsuccessful and fled to Kamrup where he became a sannyasi of Kamakhya Temple, leaving behind his wife and son. With the acceptance of the royal officers, Upananda became the king of Brahmachal and subsequently Amar Singh became the chief military general.

The long-lasted conflict between northern Gour Kingdom and southern Brahmachal, continued to trouble the land. Raja Govardhan of Gour, wanted to infiltrate Brahmachal as he was not fond of Upananda. The King was able to get on the good side of Amar Singh, who was Upananda's military general, by ordering his own military general Virabhadra to give his daughter in marriage to Amar Singh. The marriage between Amar Singh and Chandrakala was successful, despite protests, and Singh maintained a good relationship with General Virabhadra.

Singh managed to persuade the Kuki Chiefs, the border guards for the Tripura Raja just south of Brahmachal into raiding Raja Upananda's palace in the dead of the night. The plan was successful; the Kukis massacred most of the palace's inmates. A battle emerged leading to the death of Raja Upananda. Singh took control of Brahmachal with the permission of Govardhan. Govardhan's addiction of annexing neighbouring states was not over, he continued ordering Singh to fight the hill kings to the east of Brahmachal as well.

The king of the Twipra Kingdom, Ratan Manikya was informed of Singh's treacherous actions and how he tricked the Kuki chiefs, he decided that he takes actions. Ratan believed the Gour administration was going too far and decided to also put a stop to Govardhan's craving of invading neighbouring kingdoms. He sent a contingent towards Brahmachal to attack Singh. Singh's forces were outnumbered, and requested assistance from Govardhan. However, Govardhan was unable to help as Gour was facing an invasion in the north from the Jaintia Kingdom. Singh was killed by the Tripura forces and the Kuki chiefs annexed Brahmachal to the Twipra Kingdom. Jaidev Rai, son of the minister of Upananda, was made the feudal ruler under the Tripuris.

See also
History of Sylhet

References

Rulers of Sylhet
13th-century Indian people
13th-century rulers in Asia
Indian Hindus